Dead Man's Walk is a 1995 novel by American writer Larry McMurtry. It is the third book published in the Lonesome Dove series but the first installment in terms of chronology. McMurtry wrote a fourth segment to the Lonesome Dove chronicle, Comanche Moon, which describes the events of the central characters' lives between Dead Man's Walk and Lonesome Dove. The second novel in the Lonesome Dove series was the 1993 sequel to the original, called Streets of Laredo. Dead Man’s Walk was later adapted into a three-part miniseries of the same name, which aired in May, 1996.

Plot summary
In 1842, young Texas Rangers Augustus McCrae and Woodrow Call are introduced quickly and brutally to the rangering life on their first expedition, in which they are stalked by the Comanche war chief Buffalo Hump. After a narrow escape, the rangers return to civilization, only to quickly join an expedition to capture and annex Santa Fe, part of New Mexico (the part east of the Rio Grande) for Texas. The expedition, led by pirate and soldier of fortune, Caleb Cobb, is ultimately a failure; of the 200 initial adventurers, only about 40 survive, falling to starvation, bears, and Indians, only to be swiftly arrested by the Mexican authorities. Those survivors are forced to march the Jornada del Muerto ("Dead Man's Walk") to El Paso, and many, Mexican and Texan alike, die along the journey. The Texas contingent is reduced to ten persons when the captives panic after they observe cavalry drilling and are slaughtered in a blood lust as they flee. At their destination, the ten are forced to gamble for their lives by drawing a bean from a jar - a white bean signals life, a black bean death. Call and McCrae are among the five survivors. The last Rangers then return to Texas, escorting a Scottish woman and her son, who have also been held captive by the Mexicans, as well as an African woman the Comanches fear as she is thought to be a feared dark woman on a white horse who will ensure the Comanches’ downfall.

Characters
Augustus McCrae – Texas Ranger
Woodrow Call – Texas Ranger
William "Long Bill" Coleman – Texas Ranger
Johnny Carthage – Texas Ranger
Colonel Caleb Cobb – pirate who leads the Texas-Santa Fe expedition
Bigfoot Wallace – Texas Ranger scout
Shadrach – Texas Ranger scout 
Matilda Roberts – whore, also known as "The Great Western"
Captain Salazar – Mexican Army captain who takes the Texas prisoners in New Mexico
Major Laroche – Frenchman in the Mexican Army, who takes the prisoners to the leper colony
Buffalo Hump – a notorious Comanche war chief and father of Blue Duck
Kicking Wolf – Comanche warrior, accomplished horse thief
Clara Forsythe – young lady in a general store in Austin, who 'smites' Gus
Lady Lucinda Carey – Scottish nobility, leper
Willy – Lady Carey's son
Mrs. Chubb – Lady Carey's attendant
Emerald – Lady Carey's African attendant
Maggie Tilton – a prostitute who loves Woodrow F. Call and the mother of his illegitimate son Newt.

Background
Dead Man's Walk details the earliest adventures of the young Woodrow F. Call and Augustus McCrae as they join up with the Texas Rangers on a fictional expedition based loosely on the historical Texan Santa Fe Expedition of 1841. Although the exact time frame of the story is not given, the historical context of the events occurring sometime in the early 1840s is authentic. The Republic of Texas did indeed attempt to annex part of New Mexico, in what historians refer to as the Texan Santa Fe Expedition. As seen in this story, it was a failure.

During the course of this book, three other familiar and important characters are introduced. At a general store, McCrae meets Clara Forsythe, later to marry Robert Allen and become Clara Allen, Augustus's old flame in the original novel. In the same town, Call meets a prostitute named Maggie, later to become the mother of his illegitimate son, Newt. On their journey, they are tracked by the notorious Comanche warrior Buffalo Hump, future father of Blue Duck, whom they will hunt during their later days as Texas Rangers. Call and Gus also briefly encounter a fictionalized version of Charles Goodnight, a rancher and future close friend of Call's in Streets of Laredo.

Adaptations
In May 1996 it was screened on ABC as a two-part miniseries starring David Arquette as Augustus McCrae and Jonny Lee Miller as Woodrow F. Call.

External links
Texas and part of Mexico & the United States : showing the route of the first Santa Fé expedition / drawn & engd. by W. Kemble., published 1850, hosted by the Portal to Texas History.

Western (genre) novels
1995 American novels
Lonesome Dove series
Novels by Larry McMurtry
Texas literature
American historical novels
Novels set in Texas
Novels set in Austin, Texas
Novels set in New Mexico
Fiction set in 1842
Novels set in the 1840s
American novels adapted into television shows